North Bihar is a term used for the region of Bihar, India, which lies north of the Ganga river.

Towns and cities

Naugachia is a sub-division in the Bhagalpur district. It is famous for Banana farming, and known as Kelanchal of Bihar.
Purnia is the headquarters of the Purnia division and Purnia district. It is the 2nd largest city in North Bihar by population. It is also known as "Mini Darjeeling" due to its humid climate. This city is called the Gateway of North East India in Bihar.  also passes through the city that connects North East to the whole of India. Purnia Junction is the major railway of this city. Gulabbagh agriculture market is the biggest maize market in Asia.
Katihar is the headquarters of the Katihar district. Katihar is known for Jute production.
Kishanganj is the headquarters of the Kishanganj district. It is the easternmost district of Bihar. A part of this district is known as the chicken neck region of India.
Araria is the headquarters of the Araria district. NH 27 (Old NH57) connects Araria to other parts of the state.
Madhepura is the headquarters of the Madhepura district. This district was curved out from the Saharsa district. This is a flood-prone district of the Kosi region.
Supaul is the headquarters & chief town of the Supaul district. Supaul is set to get India's largest road bridge sharing some parts with the Madhubani district. The construction site of the bridge is 6 to 8 miles away from Supaul. A bridge on the mighty kosi river was built in 2012 near Nirmali in Supaul. After the inauguration of the koshi mega bridge. The bridge which was already a part of the eastern-western corridor became operational & hence completing the whole circuit of the 3507 km long Porbandar-Silchar highway, and providing direct road connectivity to cities like Lucknow & Kanpur
Saharsa is the headquarters of the Saharsa district and the Kosi division. Saharsa is located in the Mithila region, one of the earliest centers of Brahminical civilization in India. Saharsa is considered the heart of the whole Mithila region. It's the birthplace of many legends like Mandana Misra, Laxminath Gosain, Ubhai Bharti, etc. The region of Bangaon and Mahisi is one of the most civil servants producing areas.
Khagaria is the headquarters of the Khagaria district. Two major rivers of the North Bihar Ganga river and the Kosi river flows through the district.
Begusarai is the industrial and financial capital of Bihar, and headquarters of the Begusarai district. Barauni and Begusarai are the main industrial hub of Bihar. Barauni is one of the important railway junctions of Bihar. It is the land of great people like Ramdhari Singh Dinkar and Shri Krishna Sinha.
Samastipur is the headquarters of the Samastipur district. The Dr. Rajendra Prasad Central Agriculture University, India's first-ever Imperial Agriculture Research Institute, is located in Pusa, Samastipur district.
Darbhanga is the headquarters of the Darbhanga district and Darbhanga division. Darbhanga is the cultural capital of Bihar. It is considered the Medical Capital of North Bihar. It has DMCH & second AIIMS Hospital in the State after Capital Patna.
Madhubani is the headquarters of the Madhubani district. Jainagar in the Madhubani district connects North Bihar to Janakpurdham in Mithila region of Nepal.
Hajipur is the headquarters of the Vaishali district, located on the northern bank of Ganga river, opposite Patna, on the southern bank. It is the headquarters of the East Central Railway zone of the Indian Railways.
Muzaffarpur is the financial capital of North Bihar. It is the headquarters of the Muzaffarpur district and Tirhut division. All the important roadways (like NH 27, NH 28, NH 57, NH 77, NH 102) and railways (like Muzaffarpur-Hajipur, Muzaffarpur-Motihari, Muzaffarpur-Sitamarhi, Muzaffarpur-Samastipur) have their junction in the city.
Sitamarhi is the headquarters of the Sitamarhi district. It has Vedic importance as Goddess Sita is believed to be unearthed here.
Sheohar is the headquarters of the Sheohar district, the smallest district of North Bihar. It was carved out from Sitamarhi District.
Motihari is the headquarters of the East Champaran district. Mahatma Gandhi launched a non-cooperation movement there. It has been announced to establish a Central University in Motihari. This would be the first nationalized University in North Bihar.
Bettiah is the headquarters of the West Champaran district. It is the westernmost district of North Bihar, and the Northernmost district of Bihar state.
Chhapra is the headquarters of the Saran district. 
Siwan is the headquarters of the Siwan district.
Gopalganj is the headquarters of the Gopalganj district.

Languages and dialects
Bajjika is spoken in Muzaffarpur district, Vaishali district, Sitamarhi district and Sheohar district.
Bhojpuri is predominantly spoken in Saran, Siwan, Gopalganj, West Champaran, East Champaran and some parts of Muzaffarpur.
Maithili is spoken in Darbhanga division, Kosi division, Purnia division and in some parts of Tirhut division as well as in Begusarai district and Naugachia.
Surjapuri is spoken in Kishanganj, Katihar and in some eastern parts of Purnia district.

Proposed state

There is an ongoing movement in the Maithili-speaking region of Bihar for a separate Mithila state. What will be the capital of the state has yet to be decided, Begusarai, Muzaffarpur and Darbhanga are the most likely candidates.

Economy

Agricultural economy
Agriculture is the main economic activity of the region.

The above industries have generated considerable employment and have also been helpful in establishing a number of small industries, including a few cottage industries. The most important item that is manufactured in Muzaffarpur city is the railway wagon.
While dudhia malda variety of mangoes. Barauni is the prominent industrial Town of North Bihar, and Bihar state. Having Barauni Refinery, Barauni fertilizer, Barauni Carbons, railway yard and Barauni thermal power station and is the industrial capitals of North Bihar.  Hajipur is also new emerging industrial area due to its proximity with Patna leading to the development of industrial area.

North Bihar is also home to majority of sugar production of Bihar and more than 20 sugar industries are located in Bihar but about a third of it is operational mostly in Champaran belt, Gopalganj, Darbhanga, Sitamarhi, etc.

Rivers and floods
There are several rivers flowing through this region from north to south and merge in the Ganges river. These rivers along with floods bring every year fertile soil to the region. However, sometimes government sponsored floods causes loss of thousands of lives. Major rivers of North Bihar are Mahananda, Gandak, Kosi, Bagmati, Kamala, Balan, Budhi Gandak.

Natural floods
Since the beginning of human civilization, rivers have been an important part of human life. North Bihar has 7 major rivers and several tributaries to them. North Bihar districts are vulnerable to at least five major flood-causing rivers during the monsoon – Mahananda River, Koshi River, Bagmati River , Burhi Gandak River and Gandak – which originate in Nepal. All these rivers receive water from the Himalayas. This is the reason these rivers never have a shortage of water. Every year, any of these rivers had been bringing valuable floods for the people of North Bihar. Flood waters used to enter the agricultural land, leave their quite fertile silt and recede to the river. This pattern of humane flood was a boon for North Bihar. This made her land extremely fertile. But, natural floods are no more in North Bihar.

Man-made floods
Soon after independence, the Congress Government of Bihar made several attempts to domesticate these rivers. High barriers or Bandhs were made on their both banks. This resulted in inhumane and destructive floods. Bandhs caused deposition of silts in the bottom of rivers, because of which, depth of rivers decreased, and so their water holding capacity also decreased. This is the reason these rivers bring more frequent floods now. With flood water, sand comes in force and gets deposited on the land. This way the land of the region in turning barren. Floods, once a boon for North Bihar, has now become a curse.

Kosi flood 2008,

The 2008 Kosi flood was one of the most disastrous floods in the history of North Bihar, an impoverished and densely populated region in India. A breach in the Kosi embankment near the Indo-Nepal border (at Kusha in Nepal) occurred on 18 August 2008. The river changed course and inundated areas which hadn't experienced floods in many decades.  The flood affected over 2.3 million people in North Bihar.

The flood killed 250 people and forced nearly 3 million people from their homes in North Bihar. More than 300,000 houses were destroyed and at least 340,000 hectares (840,000 acres) of crops were damaged. Villagers in North Bihar ate raw rice and flour mixed with polluted water. Hunger and disease were widespread. The Supaul district was the worst-hit; surging waters swamped 1,000 square kilometers (247,000 acres) of farmlands, destroying crops.

2017 North Bihar Floods

2017 Floods affected 19 districts of North Bihar causing death of 514 people. This flood was result of sudden increase in water discharge through rivers- Gandak, Burhi Gandak and Bagmati, Kamla, Kosi and Mahananda- due to heavy rain in the catchment areas of the major rivers of north Bihar in Nepal. Araria district accounted for 95 deaths alone, followed by Sitamarhi (34), West Champaran (29), Katihar (26), East Champaran (19) while 22 have died in Madhubani, Supaul(13) and Madhepura(15). 11 deaths were reported in Kishanganj, while Darbhanga accounted for 19 deaths, Purnea (9), Gopalganj (9), Sheohar(4), Muzaffarpur(7), Samastipur(1) and Saharsa(4) registered four deaths each while Khagaria and Saran accounted for 7 deaths each. Around 1.71 crore people are hit by floods.

See also
Bihar
North India

References

External links
Tirhut
North Bihar

Mithila
Regions of Bihar